Virgil Brenci (born 2 January 1947) is a Romanian alpine skier. He competed in three events at the 1972 Winter Olympics.

References

1947 births
Living people
Romanian male alpine skiers
Olympic alpine skiers of Romania
Alpine skiers at the 1972 Winter Olympics
Place of birth missing (living people)